Prior Lake is an exurban city  southwest of Minneapolis seated next to Savage and Shakopee in Scott County in the state of Minnesota. Surrounding the shores of Lower and Upper Prior Lake, the city lies south of the Minnesota River in an area known as RiverSouth and establishes the urban fringe of the south-southwest portion of Minneapolis-St. Paul, the sixteenth largest metropolitan area in the United States. The population of Prior Lake was 22,796 at the 2010 census.

Prior Lake was first incorporated as a village in 1891. Prior Lake is one of the oldest cities in the south metro area. The city's modern rapid growth is due in part to the ease of access for commuters to the rest of the region, via the upgraded State Highway 13.

Geography

Upper Prior Lake and Lower Prior Lake sit at the center of the city in an elongated shape towards the southwest to Spring Lake. Prior Lake as a whole is the largest lake in the southern metro area.

Lakes
The nearby Dakota people originally called Prior Lake Bdé Mayá Thó, meaning Lake of the Blue Banks.

Prior Lake (renamed after Charles Prior, of the Chicago, Milwaukee, and St. Paul railroad) is made up of two sections, Upper Prior Lake and Lower Prior Lake.  The area of each is 354 and  respectively.  Upper prior Lake flows Northerly, draining into the larger, Lower prior Lake via a navigable channel that runs under Eagle Creek Avenue Scott County Highway  21.  Prior Lake is a popular destination for fishing and water sports.  Prior Lake is also popular with snowmobilers and can be accessed using the Scott County Snowmobile Trail and other designated trails in the winter.  On April 10, 2009, zebra mussel shells were discovered on the shore of Lower Prior Lake.  On April 14, the DNR confirmed that the Zebra Mussels were also in Upper Prior Lake.

The eastern portion of Spring Lake along Scott County Road 12 is also located within the City of Prior Lake.  Spring Lake, with 290 acres, but being a few minutes further out from the metro area offers similar recreational opportunities as Upper Prior Lake with a more rural character and less traffic.  Spring Lake, being several feet higher in elevation, flows north, into Upper Prior Lake via a non-navigable spillway and culvert under County Road 12.

Demographics

2000 census
As of the 2000, the median income for a household in the city was $75,363, and the median income for a family was $81,011. The per capita income for the city was $32,089.  About 1.7% of families and 12.4% of the population were below the poverty line.

2010 census
As of the census of 2010, there were 22,796 people, 8,447 households, and 6,211 families residing in the city. The racial makeup of the city was 91.0% White, 1.5% African American, 1.6% Native American, 3.0% Asian, 0.5% from other races, and 2.4% from two or more races. Hispanic or Latino of any race were 2.1% of the population.

There were 8,447 households, of which 40.1% had children under the age of 18 living with them, 61.3% were married couples living together, 8.1% had a female householder with no husband present, 4.1% had a male householder with no wife present, and 26.5% were non-families. 20.7% of all households were made up of individuals, and 6.7% had someone living alone who was 65 years of age or older. The average household size was 2.69 and the average family size was 3.14.

The median age in the city was 37.8 years. 28.6% of residents were under the age of 18; 5.9% were between the ages of 18 and 24; 28.9% were from 25 to 44; 27.4% were from 45 to 64; and 9.3% were 65 years of age or older. The gender makeup of the city was 49.7% male and 50.3% female.

2020 census
As of the 2020 census, 9,802 households housed 26,775 people within Prior Lake, approximately 2.7 people per household.

Government
Prior Lake is governed by a mayor and four council members serving at large. The city Mayor and Council are elected non-partisan. The city mayor is Kirt Briggs. He succeeded Ken Hedberg, who won an uncontested election in 2012, succeeding Mike Myser. The council members are Kevin Burkart, Zach Braid, Kim Churchill and Annette Thompson.  The city is run by a City Manager, Jason Wedel.  The city is in Minnesota Legislative District 35A.  The State Senate District 55 Senator is Eric Pratt (R).  The district 55B Representative is Tony Albright (Republican).

Prior Lake is located in Minnesota's 2nd congressional district, represented by Angie Craig, a Democrat.

Portions of the Shakopee Mdewakanton Sioux Community (SMSC) tribal lands are within the boundary of the City of Prior Lake as annexed in 1972.  The SMSC is a federally recognized, sovereign Native American tribe of Mdewakanton Dakota people. The overlap of a Minnesota Statutory City with federally recognized Indian Tribal lands resulted in litigation to clarify the boundary and voting rights.  In a 1984 United States District Court ruling, the court affirmed that the municipal boundary of the City of Prior Lake did include the tribal lands in question.  The Court further clarified that the tribal residents were thus residents of the City of Prior Lake entitled to vote in municipal elections and to emergency police, fire, and rescue services.  The Court ordered the City to provide emergency services on an equal basis as all other residents even though the federal trust status of the tribal lands deprives the City of the authority to tax the tribal lands to fund such services.  In recent years, the SMSC has paid the City of Prior Lake for the cost of those emergency services on a voluntary basis.

Arts and culture
The Prior Lake American is the main city newspaper. The Savage Pacer is also common in Prior Lake. The Star Tribune South Edition also offers some coverage.

The Mystic Showroom at the Mystic Lake Casino Hotel in Prior Lake is an entertainment venue that frequently features A-list musical and comedy performers.

Education
Following the 1999 Columbine High School Massacre, journalist Elinor Burkett spent a year following students and teachers in Prior Lake High School. She chose Prior Lake as her subject because it was found to be virtually identical to Columbine demographically. She documented her experience in the book Another Planet: A Year in the Life of a Suburban High School.

The City of Prior Lake is within the Prior Lake-Savage School District.  Prior Lake -Savage Area Schools (PLSAS) serve students in the communities of Prior Lake, Savage, Credit River Township, Spring Lake Township, Sand Creek Township, and Cedar Lake Township.
 Prior Lake High School
 Bridges Alternative Learning Center
 Hidden Oaks Middle School
 Twin Oaks Middle School
 Edgewood School
 Five Hawks Elementary
 Glendale Elementary
 Grainwood Elementary
 Hamilton Ridge Elementary
 Jeffers Pond Elementary
 Westwood Elementary
 Redtail Ridge Elementary
 SAGE Academy
 La Ola De Lago (Spanish immersion school in Edgewood school)

Prior Lake also has a private Roman Catholic parochial school, St. Michael Catholic School, which serves grades PreK through 8.
Prior Lake also has a Lutheran church Missouri Synod parochial school, St. Paul's Lutheran School Prior Lake, which serves children from infant through grade 8.

Notable people
Brock Boeser, professional ice hockey player for the Vancouver Canucks
Kylie Bunbury, model and actress.
Teal Bunbury, professional soccer player
Thomas Fluharty, illustrator, and his family live in Prior Lake.
Terry D. Johnston, businesswoman and Minnesota state senator
Becca Kufrin, television personality
Richard J. Menke, lawyer and Minnesota state legislator
Eric Pratt, Minnesota State Senator
John Robert Roach, Archbishop of St. Paul-Minneapolis (1975–1995) was born in Prior Lake on July 31, 1921.
Jessica Scheu Miss Minnesota 2015
Jordan Schroeder, (born September 29, 1990) professional ice hockey player.
Jessica Woynilko (born January 5 or May 1, 1999), better known as "Tiffany Stratton", professional wrestler
Heath Voss, (born February 17, 1978) former professional motocross racer
Erik Westrum, professional hockey player who now resides in Prior Lake

References

External links
City website

Cities in Scott County, Minnesota
Cities in Minnesota